Phloeosinus punctatus, the western cedar bark beetle, is a species of crenulate bark beetle in the family Curculionidae. It is found in North America.

References

Further reading

External links

 

Scolytinae
Beetles described in 1876